Come Dance with Me! (Italian release Sexy Girl) is a 1959 French-Italian drama film directed by Michel Boisrond and starring Brigitte Bardot. The film is based on the novel The Blonde Died Dancing by Kelley Roos.

Plot
Against her wealthy industrialist father Albert's wishes, young Virginie (Brigitte Bardot) marries dentist Hervé Dandieu (Henri Vidal). After three months, all passion has disappeared, and after an argument, Hervé leaves the house for a drink at a club. There, he is seduced by Anita Florès (Dawn Addams), a red-headed dance instructor. Unbeknownst to him, Anita is a scam artist who has sent her boyfriend Léon (Serge Gainsbourg) to photograph her in companionship with Hervé. Although Hervé eventually decides to stay faithful to his wife, Léon is able to take some pictures of their intimate moments.

Hervé refuses to give in to any of her attempts to blackmail him, until she calls him one night. Virginie and Albert overhear the conversation, after which Virginie concludes that her husband is having an affair. The next day, she follows him to Anita's dance studio, and when looking through the keyhole, she spots Anita's murdered body next to Hervé, who is holding a gun. Hervé convinces her that he is not guilty and they flee the place of crime through the back door, although they are noticed by some of the staff members. To prove her husband's innocence, she charms Anita's husband Florès (Darío Moreno) into hiring her as a dance teacher in order to gain the opportunity to find more information.

While going through the studio, Virginie catches Léon stealing money from her wallet and overhears a conversation between Léon and his mistress Daisy (Maria Pacôme), who plan on misleading the detectives. After several investigations of the inspectors, Virginie is convinced that she has found the murderer through a letter. According to her, this man is Gérard Lalemand. Because the detectives do not believe her, she decides to contact Gérard herself. She talks to him over the phone and arranges a meeting, but when he fails to show up, she locates his residence, where she is told that Mr. Lalemand has been dead for over three years. Virginie realizes that she has been talking to Gérard's son (Georges Descrières), who is the same charming gay man whom she met earlier at the studio.

Meanwhile, Léon has been arrested for blackmailing Hervé. He admits that he is the mysterious person who left the studio over the roof on the night of the murder, but claims that Hervé is the guilty one. To Hervé's surprise, Albert proves his innocence to the detectives. In the meantime, Virginie believes that she has tracked Lalemand down to Blue Fetish, a gay nightclub where he is performing as a transvestite under the alias Daniel. Upon confronting him, she realizes that the man (Philippe Nicaud) is not Lalemand, and she leaves soon afterwards to return to his residence.

There, she finds out that the real Lalemand is an acquaintance to Florès and Daisy, who have given a false statement when Lalemand was still a suspect. Virginie is told that Anita was Lelemand's father's mistress and that she had permission to profit from Lelemand's $50 million inheritance while she was still alive. Therefore, Lalemand has sent his boyfriend Daniel to kill Anita. Hervé's innocence is proven, and he gratefully kisses his wife.

Cast
 Brigitte Bardot as Virginie Dandieu
 Henri Vidal as Hervé Dandieu
 Dawn Addams as Anita Florès
 Darío Moreno as Florès
 Georges Descrières as Gérard Lalemand
 Serge Gainsbourg as Léon
 Maria Pacôme as Daisy
 François Chaumette as Joseph
 Noël Roquevert as Albert Decauville-Lachenée
 Philippe Nicaud as Daniel

Production
Unlike her earlier films, for which she received a notably lesser salary, Brigitte Bardot demanded $200,000 when she was cast. Sylvia Lopez was originally cast as Anita Florès, but terminal leukemia prohibited her from finishing the film. She withdrew after a few days of shooting and was replaced by Dawn Addams.

Shooting took place at the Victorine Studios in Nice. The film's sets were designed by the art director Jean André.

Reception
The film in US grossed $2 million, a dissatisfactory amount compared to Bardot's earlier films. The flop inspired Raoul Lévy, the producer who made Bardot a star, to stop his collaboration with Bardot.

References

External links
 

1959 films
1950s French-language films
1959 romantic drama films
French romantic drama films
Italian romantic drama films
Films based on American novels
Films directed by Michel Boisrond
French mystery drama films
Italian mystery drama films
French LGBT-related films
Italian LGBT-related films
1950s LGBT-related films
1950s mystery drama films
Films shot at Victorine Studios
1950s Italian films
1950s French films
French-language Italian films